Sinistrexcisa is a genus of air-breathing land snails, terrestrial pulmonate gastropod mollusks in the family Streptaxidae.

Distribution 
The distribution of the genus Sinistrexcisa includes:
 south-west Cameroon
 Equatorial Guinea

Description 
A spermatophore  was observed in Sinistrexcisa for the first time among the Streptaxidae in 1999.

Species
Species within the genus Sinistrexcisa include:
 Sinistrexcisa cameruniae De Winter, Gomez & Prieto, 1999 - type species, from Southwest Cameroon
 Sinistrexcisa iradieri De Winter, Gomez & Prieto, 1999 - from Equatorial Guinea
 Sinistrexcisa cogoensis De Winter, Gomez & Prieto, 1999 - from Equatorial Guinea
 Sinistrexcisa fang De Winter, Gomez & Prieto, 1999 - from Equatorial Guinea

References

Streptaxidae